Saheed Mohamed (born 6 February 1976) is a Cayman Islands cricketer. A right-handed batsman and off spin bowler, he has played for the Cayman Islands national cricket team since 2004.

Career

Saheed Mohamed first played cricket for the Cayman Islands in the 2004 Americas Championship, and the following year played in the repêchage tournament for the 2005 ICC Trophy in Kuala Lumpur in February 2005.

In 2006, he played against the Bahamas and Trinidad & Tobago in the Stanford 20/20. He scored 64 not out against the Bahamas to help his team reach the first round proper of the tournament. He followed this by playing in the Americas Championship at the Maple Leaf Cricket Club in King City, Ontario.

He most recently represented the Cayman Islands in Division Three of the World Cricket League in Darwin, Australia. In the third place play-off against Papua New Guinea, he put in a fine all-round performance, taking 2/53 and scoring 52, but this was not enough to help his team win the match.

References

1976 births
Living people
Caymanian cricketers
Guyanese cricketers
Guyanese emigrants to the Cayman Islands